The M2 MSBS was the second French submarine-launched ballistic missile. In French, MSBS is the abbreviation for Mer-Sol Balistique Stratégique, or Sea-Ground Strategic Ballistic Missile. It has two stages. It was deployed on the Redoutable-class SNLEs (Sous-marin Nucléaire Lanceur d'Engins) (Device-launching Nuclear Submarine) or SSBNs from 1974 to 1978, replacing the M1 MSBS. The M2 was itself replaced by the M20 MSBS beginning in 1977.

References

Submarine-launched ballistic missiles of France
Nuclear weapons of France
Military equipment introduced in the 1970s